Al-Sawafir al-Sharqiyya was a Palestinian Arab village in the Gaza Subdistrict. It was depopulated during the 1948 War on May 18, 1948, as part of the second stage of Operation Barak. The village was located 32 km northeast of Gaza.

History
Remains from the late Roman (third–fourth centuries CE),   Byzantine (fifth–beginning of seventh centuries CE), and Abbasid eras have been found here. Columns and fragments were noted near the well.

Ottoman era
Al-Sawafir al-Sharqiyya was like the rest of Palestine, incorporated into the Ottoman Empire in 1517, and in the census of 1596, the village appeared as Sawafir as-Sarqi under the administration of the nahiya of Gaza, part of the Liwa of Gaza. The place was noted as hali, that is empty, but  taxes were paid on wheat, barley, summer crops, vineyards, fruit trees and cotton; a total of  9,000 akçe. 

In 1838  the three Sawafir villages  were noted  located in  the Gaza district. The western village (=Al-Sawafir al-Gharbiyya) was noted as "in ruins or deserted,” while the two others were noted as being Muslim.

In 1863 Victor Guérin found  it to be the largest of the three Sawafir villages.

In 1882  the PEF's Survey of Western Palestine described it as one of three Suafir  adobe villages. Each had small gardens and wells.

British Mandate era
According to the 1922 census of Palestine conducted by the British Mandate authorities, Al-Sawafir al-Sharqiyya had a population of 588 inhabitants, all Muslims, increasing in  the 1931 census  to an all-Muslim  population of 787  in  148 houses.

In the  1945 statistics, it had a population of 970 Muslims,  with a total of 13,831  dunams of land.  Of this, 585 dunams  were for citrus and bananas, 386 for plantations or irrigable land, 11,821 dunums were for cereals, while 40 dunams were  classified as built-up, urban  land.

The village shared a school with the other two Sawafir villages, and it had an enrollment of about 280 in 1945. The village had its own mosque.

1948 War and aftermath
In early May, 1948, the inhabitants of the three Al-Sawafir villages were ordered not to flee, by the  Al-Majdal National Committee. At the 23 May, 1948, Israeli reports say that at all the three Al-Sawafir villages the inhabitants slept in the fields at night, but returned to work in the villages by day.

In 1992 the village site was described: "No houses remain on the site. New buildings stand on the spot where the Mosque used  to be. Some traces of the former village are still present on the surrounding lands, however. There is a building for a water-pump in Isma'il al-Sawafiri's orchard, an old sycamore tree in the al-Buhaysi family's orchard, and an old cypress tree in an otherwise vacant field."

References

Bibliography

  
 
 
   

Nasser, G.A. (1955/1973):  "Memoirs" in Journal of Palestine Studies
" “Memoirs of the First Palestine War” in 2, no. 2 (Win. 73): 3-32, pdf-file, downloadable

External links
Welcome To al-Sawafir al-Sharqiyya
al-Sawafir al-Sharqiyya, Zochrot
Survey of Western Palestine, Map 16:   IAA, Wikimedia commons
al-Sawafir al-Sharqiyya, from the Khalil Sakakini Cultural Center
"My village was attacked and burned down": a Nakba  survivor speaks, Electronic Intifada

Arab villages depopulated during the 1948 Arab–Israeli War
District of Gaza